Files from Scotland Yard is a 1951 British crime film directed by Anthony Squire and starring John Harvey, Moira Lister and Louise Hampton. It was made as a second feature on a very low-budget, and the production company was wound up soon afterwards.

Cast
 John Harvey as Jim Hardy  
 Moira Lister as Joanna Goring  
 Louise Hampton as Agatha Steele  
 Reginald Purdell as Inspector Gower  
 Dora Bryan as Minnie Robinson 
 Ben Williams

References

Bibliography
 Chibnall, Steve & McFarlane, Brian. The British 'B' Film. Palgrave MacMillan, 2009.

External links

1951 films
British crime films
1951 crime films
Films directed by Anthony Squire
Films set in London
British black-and-white films
1950s English-language films
1950s British films